East Firsby and West Firsby are two hamlets in the West Lindsey district of Lincolnshire, England.

East Firsby civil parish was abolished to enlarge that of West Firsby in 1936. There is no church.

The hamlet of Firsby is listed in the 1086 Domesday Book as "Frisebi", with 22 households,  of meadow and a church, with Ilbert of Lacy as Lord of the Manor.

The Manor House at West Firsby fell into disrepair and was demolished during the 1990s. At East Firsby is the mid 18th-century Grade II listed Manor Farmhouse, and at West Firsby is a site of a deserted medieval village.

There is an oilfield at West Firsby.

References

External links
 Saxby and East Firsby website
 Saxon House website

West Lindsey District